The intervertebral foramen (also called neural foramen, and often abbreviated as IV foramen or IVF) is a foramen between two spinal vertebrae. Cervical, thoracic, and lumbar vertebrae all have intervertebral foramina.

The foramina, or openings, are present between every pair of vertebrae in these areas. A number of structures pass through the foramen. These are the root of each spinal nerve, the spinal artery of the segmental artery, communicating veins between the internal and external plexuses, recurrent meningeal (sinu-vertebral) nerves, and transforaminal ligaments.

When the spinal vertebrae are articulated with each other, the bodies form a strong pillar that supports the head and trunk, and the vertebral foramen constitutes a canal for the protection of the medulla spinalis (spinal cord).

The size of the foramina is variable due to placement, pathology, spinal loading, and posture.

Foramina can be occluded by arthritic degenerative changes and space-occupying lesions like tumors, metastases, and spinal disc herniations.

Specifically, the intervertebral foramen is bordered by the superior notch of the adjacent vertebra, the inferior notch of the vertebra, the intervertebral joint and the intervertebral disc.

References

External links

skeleton2/intervertebralforamen Photo of model at Waynesburg College

Bones of the thorax
Bones of the vertebral column